Talala Junction railway station is a  railway station on the Western Railway network in the state of Gujarat, India. Talala Junction railway station is 25 km far away from Veraval Junction railway station. Passenger trains halt here.

Major Trains 

 52929/52930 Amreli - Veraval MG Passenger (UnReserved)
 52933/52946 Amreli - Veraval MG Passenger (UnReserved)
 52949/52950 Delvada - Veraval MG Passenger (UnReserved)
 52951/52952 Delvada - Junagadh MG Passenger (UnReserved)

References

Railway stations in Gir Somnath district
Bhavnagar railway division
Railway junction stations in Gujarat